Liberate Hong Kong is a 3D single-player third-person simulation video game developed by the Hong Kong protesters during the 2019–2020 Hong Kong protests. The game simulates the protests environment of Hong Kong, and the protagonist is an unarmed and unnamed protester.

The game was released for Microsoft Windows and Mac OS in November 2019, and supports virtual reality devices such as Oculus Rift and HTC Vive.

Gameplay

In the game, police attack the protesters with a variety of weapons, but the protesters, being completely unarmed, cannot return fire. Playing as one of the protesters, the player must dodge police attacks and keep protesting without getting arrested. The game does not end until the player gets arrested or shot by the police.

Censorship on Steam
In June 2018, Steam, a gaming distribution platform, claimed that they will stop censoring games given that it is not illegal or trolling. However, there are still accusations about Steam's political censorship. In December 2019, the development team of Liberate Hong Kong wrote an open letter to Steam, accusing the company of censoring the game without giving any reason.

See also 
Liberate Hong Kong, revolution of our time
Oculus Rift

References

External links
Game developer Facebook Page
Game Official Page

2019 video games
MacOS games
Video games developed in Hong Kong
Video games set in Hong Kong
Windows games
Oculus Rift games
HTC Vive games
2019–2020 Hong Kong protests
Culture of Hong Kong